Selliguea hastata is a fern species in the genus Selliguea.

References

External links

hastata